Ernest George 'Ernie' Wilson (18 October 1900 – 7 June 1982) was an Australian rules footballer who played for Collingwood in the Victorian Football League (VFL).

Wilson featured in the Collingwood side during a strong era, playing in no less than six Grand Finals. He was on a half forward flank in their 1919 premiership but was used mostly as a defender. His other Grand Final appearances came in 1920, 1922, 1925 and 1926 while he was a half back flanker in the Collingwood premiership team of 1927. He could have added another in 1928, but lost his place in the side after the drawn semi final against Melbourne which would be his last game. In 1929 he played with Northcote in the VFA. He was reported in the last few minutes of the Grand Final which Northcote won by 5 points. He received a 12-month suspension for the offense and returned to Collingwood in 1930 where he captain coached the reserve team until the end of the 1933 season. He also represented Victoria at interstate football, a total of nine times, including in the 1924 Hobart Carnival. He remains the only player to have represented Victoria whilst under suspension from the VFL.

References

Holmesby, Russell and Main, Jim (2007). The Encyclopedia of AFL Footballers. 7th ed. Melbourne: Bas Publishing.

External links

1900 births
1982 deaths
Australian rules footballers from Melbourne
Australian Rules footballers: place kick exponents
Collingwood Football Club players
Collingwood Football Club Premiership players
South Yarra Football Club players
Northcote Football Club players
Two-time VFL/AFL Premiership players
People from Collingwood, Victoria